Weenusk First Nation (; unpointed: ᐧᐃᓇᐢᑯ ᐃᓂᓂᐧᐊᐠ) is a Cree First Nation band government in the Canadian province of Ontario. In September, 2007, its total registered population was 516.  Weenusk First Nation was an independent member of the Nishnawbe Aski Nation (NAN) but now have joined the Mushkegowuk Council, a regional tribal council, who is also a member of NAN.

Weenusk First Nation's reserve is the 5310 ha Winisk Indian Reserve 90. Associated with the reserve is their Winisk Indian Settlement also known as Peawanuck, which also holds reserve status.

In the Cree language, "Peawanuck" means "a place where flint is found," while "Weenusk" means "ground hog."  The community, being primarily Swampy Cree, speaks the n-dialect of the Cree language.  Being that the community is composed of Cree, Oji-cree, Ojibwa and Métis peoples, in addition to Cree, Anishininiimowin and Ojibwemowin are also spoken there.

Governance
Weenusk is governed by Chief George Hunter and his Deputy Chief Luke Bird and two councillors: Mary Stoney and Georgina Wabano.

External links
 Chiefs of Ontario profile
 Detailed community profile from the Wakenagun Development Corporation
 AANDC profile

First Nations governments in Ontario
Swampy Cree
Communities in Kenora District
Algonquian ethnonyms
Hudson's Bay Company trading posts